Sargis N. Kakabadze (October 7, 1886 – April 2, 1967) was a  Georgian historian and philologist, Doctor of Historical Sciences, Professor.

He was born in 1886, in a small village Kukhi (Imereti region of Western Georgia). In 1910 he graduated from the Faculty of Oriental Languages of the St.Petersburg University (Russia). In 1911-1918 he was a teacher of History of the Georgian Gymnasium of Tbilisi, in 1919-1967 Professor of the Tbilisi State University (TSU), in 1921-1926 Director of the State Historical Archive of Georgia, in 1945-1961 head of the Department of the Old Acts of this Archive.

Main fields of scientific activity of Sargis Kakabadze were: history of Georgia, source studies of the history of Georgia and the Caucasus, history of Georgian literature, Rustvelology (Shota Rustaveli was a great Georgian poet of the 12th century), etc. He was author of more than 100 scientific-research articles and many important monographs.

Sargis Kakabadze died in 1967, in Tbilisi.

Selected works
 "Character of the feudal system in Georgia of the end of Middle Ages" (a monograph), Tbilisi, 1912 (in Russian)
 "About the Georgian historians of the 11th century" (a monograph), Tbilisi, 1912 (in Russian)
 "Social-economic questions of Georgia of the Middle Ages" (a monograph), Tbilisi, 1927 (in Russian)
 "Vakhtang Gorgasali" (a monograph), Tbilisi, 1959 (in Georgian)
 "Rustaveli and his poem "The Knight in the Panther's Skin"" (a monograph), Tbilisi, 1966 (in Georgian)
 Kakabadze S., Queen Tamar: Her Significance, translated by Michael P.Willis, 2017. 

1886 births
1967 deaths
Burials at Didube Pantheon
Academic staff of Tbilisi State University
20th-century historians from Georgia (country)
Soviet historians